Likovsky ITL, Likovlag, or Construction site number 204 was a Soviet Gulag labour camp in Moscow oblast whose inmates built the Vnukovo airport.

History 
The concentration camp was established on 16 August 1938. It was located between the villages Likova and Izvarino, Kuntsevsky rayon, Moscow Oblast. The construction was personally overseen by Kliment Voroshilov.

Prisoners of Likovlag were also working on the construction of a residential building for the Soviet elite on the Frunzenskaya embankment in central Moscow.

The camp was closed down soon after completion of the construction of Vnukovo airport in late 1941.

Number of inmates

Camp commandants 

 Krichmar Ya.N., since 16 August 38
 Umov I.A. (mentioned in January and April 1941)
 Makukha ?.?., by 16 October 1941

Links 
 НКВД: Место службы — Ликовский ИТЛ и строительство № 204 - Кадровый состав органов государственной безопасности СССР. 1935−1939 [Selected biographies of NKVD staff serving in Likovlag]

References

Camps of the Gulag
History of Moscow Oblast
Vnukovo International Airport